Erlend Slettevoll (born 26 October 1981) is a Norwegian jazz pianist, known from cooperation with musicians like Ola Kvernberg, Petter Wettre, Heidi Skjerve, Kjetil Møster, Steinar Raknes and Espen Aalberg.

Career
Slettevoll was born in Volda and is a graduate of the jazz program at Trondheim Musikkonservatorium (2001–05). He was first recognized as member of the band The Core together with fellow students in Trondheim, Kjetil Møster, Steinar Raknes and Espen Aalberg. Later he worked with musicians like Petter Wettre and Heidi Skjerve.

Grand General is the latest project including Slettevoll. Having played a few gigs as Kenneth Kapstad Group this lineup released their debut album Grand General in 2013. Violinist Ola Kvernberg, who was awarded Spellemannprisen for his album Liarbird, was in the forefront. One can not help comparing the music on this album with the Mahavishnu Orchestra, with a delicate interplay between the soloists and an impressive rhythm section.

Discography 
2004: Vision (Jazzaway), within The Core
2006: Cape Point (Bergland), within African Pepperbirds
2006: Coming Home (Curling Legs), within Heidi Skjerve Quintet
2006: Blue Sky (Jazzaway), within The Core
2007: Fountain of Youth (Household Records), within Petter Wettre Quartet
2007: Indian Core (Grappa Music), within The Core feat. Prasenjit Mitra, Kanchman Babbar and Fateh Ali
2007: Meditations on Coltrane (Grappa Music), with Bergen Big Band feat. The Core
2007: Office Essentials (Jazzland Records), within The Core
2008: Golonka Love (Moserobie), within The Core
2008: Morning News of the Woods (Curling Legs), within Heidi Skjerve Quintet
2008: Night Creatures (Pling Music), within "Audun Automat"
2009: The art of no return, Vol. 1 (Moserobie), within The Core and More
2010: Party (Moserobie), with among others Jonas Kullhammar and Kjetil Møster (recorded, mixed and producer by Espen Aalberg)
2011: Rainbow Band (Losen Records), The Rainbow Band Sessions, directed by John Surman
2011: Min Song Og Hjarteskatt (Kirkelig Kulturverksted), with Beate S. Lech
2013: Grand General (Rune Grammofon), within Grand General
2014: Playing Up To My Standards'' (Household Records), with Petter Wettre

References

External links 

21st-century Norwegian pianists
Norwegian jazz pianists
Norwegian jazz composers
Norwegian University of Science and Technology alumni
Musicians from Volda
Living people
1981 births
Jazzaway Records artists
Jazzland Recordings (1997) artists
Curling Legs artists
Grappa Music artists
Household Records artists
Petter Wettre Quartet members
The Core (band) members
Grand General (band) members